Centrosaura apodema,  Uzzell's neusticurus, is a species of lizard in the family Gymnophthalmidae. It is found in Costa Rica and Panama. It is monotypic in the genus Centrosaura.

References

Gymnophthalmidae
Monotypic lizard genera
Taxobox binomials not recognized by IUCN